The Spalding Gentlemen's Society is a learned society based in Spalding, Lincolnshire, England, concerned with cultural, scientific and antiquarian subjects. It is Britain's oldest such provincial body, founded in 1710 by Maurice Johnson (1688–1755) of Ayscoughfee Hall. Membership is open to anyone aged 18 or over: the term "gentlemen" in the title is historical – there is no discrimination between men and women. Its Grade II listed museum in Broad Street, Spalding, was designed by Joseph Boothroyd Corby and opened in 1911; additions to the building ensued in 1925 and 1960. The carved outside panels were by Jules Tuerlinckx of Malines, a Belgian refugee in the First World War.

History

The Spalding Gentlemen's Society started in 1710 with informal meetings of a few gentlemen at a local coffee house in Spalding called Youngers. Many gentlemen's clubs formed in this way around that time. They talked about local antiquities and discussed the popular London newspaper The Tatler. In 1712 the society was organised in a more formal way as a Society of Gentlemen, for the supporting of mutual benevolence, and their improvement in the liberal sciences and in polite learning. Officers were appointed and minutes were kept. Francis Scott, 2nd Duke of Buccleuch (1695–1751), became Patron in 1732.

Records of the society's earliest activities have been published by the Lincoln Record Society as The Correspondence of the Spalding Gentlemen's Society, 1710–1761 and Minute-Books of The Spalding Gentlemen's Society, 1712–1755. Later works appear in catalogues as produced by "Spalding Gentleman's Society" in 1892 and 1893.

Notable members
Noteworthy and early members of the "Gentlemen's Society at Spalding" include:
Sir Isaac Newton. Stukeley's unpublished memoir of Newton mentions his joining the society, and making a substantial donation of books.
Ayuba Suleiman Diallo, freed slave, Muslim cleric and aristocrat from Senegal
Dr William Stukeley, cleric and antiquary
Sir Hans Sloane, President of the Royal Society, whose museum and library formed the nucleus of the British Museum
"Honest Tom" Martin, antiquary
Alexander Pope, poet
Alexander Gordon, antiquary
Sir Joseph Banks, naturalist and botanist
Emanuel Mendes da Costa, botanist and conchologist
Sir George Gilbert Scott, Gothic revival architect
Alfred, Lord Tennyson, Poet Laureate
George Vertue, engraver
Joseph Ayloffe, antiquary
John Anstis, F.R.S. Garter King of Arms
John Gay, the poet
Rev. Richard Bentley, D.D., classical scholar
Captain John Perry, engineer
Pishey Thompson, historian of Boston
Andrew Michael Ramsay, Scottish writer
Lord Curzon of Kedleston
Lord Peckover, Quaker banker and philanthropist of Wisbech
Lord Ancaster, the Society's Patron from 1960 to 1983
Francis Bellinger, LRCP, (d. 1721), English physician

Gallery

References

Further reading

External links

The Gentlemen's Society at Spalding: its origin and progress (1851) Bound with a catalogue of the society's library, 1893

1710 establishments in England
Scientific organizations established in 1710
Clubs and societies in England
Culture in Lincolnshire
History of Lincolnshire
Regional and local learned societies of the United Kingdom
Science and technology in Lincolnshire
Spalding, Lincolnshire
Organisations based in Lincolnshire
Scientific societies based in the United Kingdom
Museums in Lincolnshire